Pipturus schaeferi is a species of plant in the family Urticaceae. It is endemic to French Polynesia.

References

Flora of French Polynesia
schaeferi
Vulnerable plants
Taxonomy articles created by Polbot